The 1961 Tipperary Senior Hurling Championship was the 71st staging of the Tipperary Senior Hurling Championship since its establishment by the Tipperary County Board in 1887.

Toomevara were the defending champions.

On 15 October 1961, Thurles Sarsfields won the championship after a 3-04 to 0-09 defeat of Toomevara in the final at Páirc Shíleáin. It was their 23rd championship title overall and their first title since 1959.

Results

Final

Championship statistics

Miscellaneous

 The final between Thurles Sarsfields and Toomevara was to be played on 8 October 1961, however, the game was postponed due to the death of Toomevara player Jerh Hough.
 Thurles Sarsfields player Mickey Byrne set a new record by becoming the first player to win 10 championship medals.

References

Tipperary
Tipperary Senior Hurling Championship